Arracacia filipes is a plant species native to the Mexican State of Durango.

Arracacia filipes is a biennial herb with a large taproot. Flowers are green.

References

Apioideae
Endemic flora of Mexico
Flora of Durango
Taxa named by Lincoln Constance
Taxa named by Mildred Esther Mathias